Water and Power is a 1989 experimental documentary film by Pat O'Neill.

Summary
A reflection between nature and man in Los Angeles about the city's surroundings' desertification due to enormous water consumption.

Reception
It won the Documentary Grand Jury Prize at the 1990 Sundance Film Festival. It was selected to the United States National Film Registry in 2009 as "culturally, historically, or aesthetically significant". Water and Power was preserved by the Academy Film Archive in 2009 in conjunction with Pat O'Neill.

See also
1989 in film
The Decay of Fiction-a 2002 film also by O'Neill
Art film

References

External links
 
 TCM.com

1989 films
Films directed by Pat O'Neill
United States National Film Registry films
Films set in Los Angeles
1989 documentary films
1980s avant-garde and experimental films
1980s English-language films
1980s American films